Ghoti is a creative respelling of the word fish, used to illustrate irregularities in English spelling and pronunciation.

Explanation
The word is intended to be pronounced in the same way, using these sounds:
 gh, pronounced  as in enough  or tough ;
 o, pronounced  as in women ;
 ti, pronounced  as in nation  or motion .

The key to the phenomenon is that the pronunciations of the constructed word's three parts are inconsistent with how they would ordinarily be pronounced in those placements. To illustrate: gh can only resemble f when following the letters ou or au at the end of certain morphemes ("tough", "cough", "laugh"), while ti would only resemble sh when followed by a vowel sound ("martian", "patient", "spatial"). The expected pronunciation in English would sound like "goaty" , not "fish".

History
In 1815, there were several examples of absurd spellings given in a book by Alexander J. Ellis, A Plea for Phonotypy and Phonography, which advocated spelling reform. However, ghoti was not among the examples, which were all relatively lengthy and thus harder to remember.

The first confirmed use of ghoti is in a letter dated 11 December 1855 from Charles Ollier to Leigh Hunt. On the third page of the letter, Ollier explains, "My son William has hit upon a new method of spelling Fish." Ollier then demonstrates the rationale, "So that ghoti is fish." The letter credits ghoti to William Ollier Jr., born 1824.

An early known published reference is an October 1874 article by S. R. Townshend Mayer in St. James's Magazine, which cites the letter.

Another relatively early appearance of ghoti was in a 1937 newspaper article, and the term is alluded to in the 1939 James Joyce experimental work of fiction Finnegans Wake.

Ghoti is often cited to support English spelling reform, and is often attributed to George Bernard Shaw, a supporter of this cause. However, the word does not appear in Shaw's writings, and a biography of Shaw attributes it instead to an anonymous spelling reformer. Similar constructed words exist that demonstrate English idiosyncrasies, but ghoti is one of  the most widely recognized.

Notable usage
In Finnegans Wake (published in 1939), James Joyce alludes to ghoti: "Gee each owe tea eye smells fish." ("G-H-O-T-I spells 'fish'.") (p. 299). On p. 51, that fishabed ghoatstory may also allude to ghoti.
In the artistic language Klingon,   is the proper word for "fish".
In  "An Egg Grows in Gotham", a 1966 episode of the television series Batman, the villain Egghead uses "Ghoti Oeufs" as the name for his caviar business, and Batman explains the reference to Robin.
Ghoti Hook is a 1990s Christian punk band.
Ghoti has been used to test speech synthesizers. The Speech! allophone-based speech synthesizer software for the BBC Micro was tweaked to pronounce ghoti as fish. Examination of the code reveals the string GHOTI used to identify the special case.
In the  Yu-Gi-Oh! Trading Card Game, there is a series of fish-type cards called "Ghoti".
The second track of Lupe Fiasco's 2022 album, Drill Music in Zion, is titled "Ghoti".

See also
 English-language spelling reform
 English orthography
 English phonology
 "The Chaos", a poem which demonstrates the irregularity of English orthography

References

External links
 How to pronounce "ghoti"
 Hou tu pranownse Inglish, an essay on grapheme-to-phoneme rules that discusses "ghoti"
 "What is ghoti?" by Jim Scobbie

English words
English orthography